is a 1967 kaiju film directed by Ishirō Honda, with special effects by Eiji Tsuburaya. The film was a Japanese–American co-production between Toho and Rankin/Bass, and stars Rhodes Reason, Linda Miller, Akira Takarada, Mie Hama, Eisei Amamoto, with Haruo Nakajima as King Kong and Hiroshi Sekita as Mechani-Kong and Gorosaurus. The film is loosely based on Rankin/Bass' series, The King Kong Show, and was the second and final Toho-produced film featuring King Kong. King Kong Escapes was released in Japan on July 22, 1967, and released in the United States on June 19, 1968. It is the fourth entry in the King Kong franchise.

Plot 

An evil genius named Dr. Who creates Mechani-Kong, a robot version of King Kong, to dig for the highly radioactive Element X, found only at the North Pole. Mechani-Kong enters an ice cave and begins to dig into a glacier, but the radiation destroys its brain circuits and the robot shuts down. Who then sets his sights on getting the real Kong to finish the job. Who is taken to task by a female overseer, Madame Piranha, whose country's government is financing the doctor's schemes, and frequently berates him for his failure to get results.

Meanwhile, a submarine commanded by Carl Nelson arrives at Mondo Island, where the legendary King Kong lives. Here, the giant ape gets into an intense fight with a giant dinosaur Gorosaurus and a sea serpent. He falls in love with Lt. Susan Watson (played by Linda Jo Miller) following in the footsteps of Ann Darrow from the 1933 film.

Dr. Who subsequently goes to Mondo Island, abducts Kong, and brings him back to his base at the North Pole. Kong is hypnotized by a flashing light device and fitted with a radio earpiece. Who commands Kong to retrieve Element X from the cave. Problems with the earpiece ensue and Who has to kidnap Susan Watson, the only person who can control Kong.

After Watson and her fellow officers are captured by Who, Madame Piranha unsuccessfully tries to seduce Nelson to bring him over to her side. Eventually Kong escapes and swims all the way to Japan where the climactic battle with Mechani-Kong transpires. The two giants face off at the Tokyo Tower in the finale. Kong prevails and destroys Mechani-Kong and kills Who and his men. Then Kong triumphantly swims back to his island home.

Cast

Production 
The story is partly a remake of the animated TV series (itself a retelling of the original 1933 film) about a tamed Kong who is befriended by a boy and directed to fight for the forces of good. That concept (minus the boy) is combined with a mad scientist story with elements from the then-popular spy film genre. The sinister Dr. Who is patterned after James Bond villains Dr. Julius No and Ernst Stavro Blofeld. His partner, Madame Piranha, is an Asian spy played by Mie Hama, fresh from the Bond film You Only Live Twice (1967). Submarine commander Carl Nelson is similar to Admiral Nelson, commander of the submarine Seaview in Voyage to the Bottom of the Sea, a series that also featured giant monsters and stories about international espionage.

Veteran voice actor Paul Frees dubbed the voice of Dr. Who in the American version.

In an interview with Reason on the making of this film, Paul Frees did almost all the male voices for the dubbed version, save for Carl Nelson, where Reason returned to dub the character's voice. Frees apparently asked Reason why he was there and said as a joke: "Why are you here? I could probably do a better version of you than you could.".

Linda Miller hated her dubbed voice in the American version, but loved the Japanese voice. She was extremely mad at Mr. Rankin, the producer, for not inviting her to dub her own lines when Rhodes Reason (Nelson) was able to re-dub his. It turned out to work this way because Reason was a part of the Screen Actors Guild, and Linda Miller was only a model, and still residing in Japan at the time (transportation costs to New York would have been prohibitive).
 
The shot of Gorosaurus living on Monster Island seen in the 1969 film All Monsters Attack was actually stock footage taken from this film.

Special effects
 Eiji Tsuburaya - Special effects director
 Sadamasa Arikawa - Secondary special effects director
 Teruyoshi Nakano - Assistant special effects director
 Takeo Kita - Art direction
 Fumio Nakadai - Wireworks director
 Yasuyuki Inoue - Special effects sets

Release

Theatrical

Toho re-released the film in 1973 as part of the Champion Matsuri (東宝チャンピオンまつり), a film festival that ran from 1969 through 1978 and featured numerous films packaged together and aimed at children. In 1983, the film was screened during the Godzilla Resurrection Festival.

Outside Japan and the U.S, the film received a wide release in most international markets, where it went by different titles.  The film was released in West Germany as King-Kong, Frankensteins Sohn (King Kong: Frankenstein's Son), in Belgium as La Revanche de King Kong (The Revenge of King Kong) - a direct translation of the Japanese title, in Italy as King Kong il gigante della foresta (King Kong, the Giant of the Forest), in Turkey as Canavarlarin Gazabi (Wrath of the Monsters), in Mexico as El Regreso de King Kong (The Return of King Kong), in Finland as King Kong kauhun saarella (King Kong on the Island of Terror), and in Sweden as King Kong på skräckens ö (King Kong on Terror Island)

Home media
The film has been released twice on DVD. The first time as a double feature two-pack (separate keep cases) with King Kong vs. Godzilla on November 29, 2005 and again on April 1, 2014.

Reception

Box office 
The film opened in the United States in June 1968 as a double feature with the Don Knotts comedy/Western film The Shakiest Gun in the West (itself a remake of the 1948 Bob Hope comedy/Western film The Paleface). In France, the film sold 1,014,593 tickets.

Critical response 
Contemporary American reviews were mixed. New York Times film critic Vincent Canby gave it a particularly insulting review, commenting, "The Japanese ... are all thumbs when it comes to making monster movies like 'King Kong Escapes.' The Toho moviemakers are quite good in building miniature sets, but much of the process photography—matching the miniatures with the full-scale shots—is just bad ... the plotting is hopelessly primitive ..."

The July 15, 1968, issue of Film Bulletin, however, gave it a more positive review, saying, "Grown-ups who like their entertainments on a comic-strip level will find this good fun and the Universal release (made in Japan) has plenty of ballyhoo angles to draw the school-free youngsters in large numbers."

Legacy

Toho wanted to use King Kong again after this film. King Kong was included in an early draft for the 1968 film Destroy All Monsters but was ultimately dropped due to the fact that Toho's license on the character was set to expire. Toho managed to get some use out of the suit, though. The suit was reused to play the character "Gorilla" in episode #38 of the Toho giant superhero show Go! Greenman. The three-part episode, titled "Greenman vs. Gorilla", aired from March 21, 1974 through March 23, 1974.

Toho would bring the character Gorosaurus into the Godzilla series in Destroy All Monsters, using the same suit from this film. The suit was reused again four years later (at this point in a dilapidated condition) to portray the character in episode #6 of the Toho giant superhero show Go! Godman. The six-part episode, titled "Godman vs. Gorosaurus", aired from November 9, 1972 through November 15, 1972.

In the early 1990s when plans for a King Kong vs. Godzilla remake fell through, Toho had planned to bring back Mechani-Kong as an opponent for Godzilla in the project Godzilla vs. Mechani-Kong. However, according to Koichi Kawakita, it was discovered that obtaining permission to use even the likeness of King Kong would be difficult. Kawakita stated:

Toho wanted to pit Godzilla against King Kong because King Kong vs. Godzilla was very successful. However, the studio thought that obtaining permission to use King Kong would be difficult. So, it instead decided to use MechaniKong. Soon afterward, it was discovered that obtaining permission even to use the likeness of King Kong would be difficult. So, the project was canceled. MechaniKong was going to have injectors. A number of people were going to be injected into Godzilla while the robot was wrestling with him. They then were going to do battle with Godzilla from within while MechaniKong continued to do battle with him from without. There were going to be many different strange worlds inside Godzilla. The concept was very much like the one on which Fantastic Voyage was based.

References 
Notes

Bibliography
 Canby, Vincent. "New King Kong:Ape-Hero Is Uncle Tom in Japanese Version" (film review) The New York Times. July 11, 1968.
 Variety June 26, 1968.
 Ragone, August (2007, 2014). Eiji Tsuburaya: Master of Monsters San Francisco, California: Chronicle Books.

External links 

 
 —an interview with actress Linda Miller (Susan Watson)
 

1967 films
1960s monster movies
American fantasy adventure films
American science fiction films
1960s science fiction films
1960s fantasy films
Films about dinosaurs
Films based on television series
Films directed by Ishirō Honda
Films set in Tokyo
Films set on fictional islands
Giant monster films
Japanese fantasy adventure films
1960s Japanese-language films
Japanese science fiction films
Kaiju films
King Kong (franchise) films
Live-action films based on animated series
Japanese robot films
Toho tokusatsu films
Toho films
Universal Pictures films
Films produced by Tomoyuki Tanaka
Films scored by Akira Ifukube
Rankin/Bass Productions films
Mad scientist films
Films about terrorism
Mecha films
Films set in Antarctica
1960s American films